Elmstead Market is a village in the civil parish of Elmstead, in the Tendring district of Essex, England. It lies 3 km north-east of Wivenhoe and 6 km east of Colchester. It is on the A133 road which runs to Clacton-on-Sea to the south-east and Colchester to the west. In 2018 it had an estimated population of 1,684.

Churches
The Church of England parish church is dedicated to Saint Anne, the mother of the Virgin Mary and Saint Lawrence of Rome, a leader of the Early Church and a martyr. The main parts of the church have been dated to around 1310; a south chapel was added about 20 years later. The early 14th-century tower only rises one and a half storeys and was never completed.

The village used to have a Wesleyan Methodist Chapel, built in 1817. It was demolished in 1999 for a newer chapel to be built in its place. This is now Trinity Methodist Church and is situated on Bromley Road, completed in 2000. In July 2020 it was announced the Methodist church would close. At time of writing, any future use of building yet to be decided.

Transport
There are regular buses operating between Colchester and Clacton, including the X76 Monday to Saturday, operated by Hedingham & Chambers, and the 76 on Sundays, operated by First Essex. A number of school services also connect the village to the Colne School and Norman Way in Colchester.

The nearest train station is Alresford station ( away) with frequent trains to Colchester, Liverpool Street (London), as well as Frinton-on-Sea and Walton-on-the-Naze.

Schools
The village hosts two schools, Elmstead Primary School and Nursery and Market Field School, the latter of which is a school for students who experience moderate learning difficulties. Elmstead Primary School was rated "good" by Ofsted in 2014 whilst Market Field has been rated Outstanding in 2015. Market Field School underwent a complete rebuild after receiving funding. The new building was officially opened in March 2016 by Bernard Jenkin, MP for Harwich and North Essex, and Babs Wiggins, a retired teacher, who taught at Market Field School for nearly 40 years.

Woodland Trust Wood
The Woodland Trust acquired  worth of land west of the village. The new woodland creation project has already seen thousands of trees planted and plans to provide a valuable resource for local people and its wildlife. The new woodlands will be a breeding ground for barn owls and buzzards with the opportunity of more wildlife entering the area. With the dramatic fall in water vole numbers in the local area, the Essex Environmental Trust granted the wood an extra £8,000 to maintain and renew its habitat in order to increase numbers.

Notable residents
Beth Chatto (1923–2018), plantswoman, garden designer and author best known for creating the Beth Chatto Gardens near Elmstead Market
James Noah Paxman (1831–1922), founder of the engineering works Davey Paxman & Co of Colchester in 1865, making steam engines, boilers, agricultural machinery and mill gearing. He was born in Elmstead Market where his father, James Paxman, had a forge and engineering works making traction engines. He served as Mayor of Colchester in 1887–1888 and 1897–1898.
Albert Marshall (1897–2005), was the last surviving British cavalryman to have seen battle on the Western Front in the Great War.
Peter Louis Potter (1925-2019), Lancaster tail gunner in 626 Squadron from RAF Wickenby during WW2. Awarded Legion d'honneur in 2017 from France. Served one tour of duty with 31 official operations. Also temporary member of Auxiliary Units in Fingringhoe Patrol. In October 2022 "Peter Potter Way" was unveiled in the Hunters Chase housing development in Elmstead Market, in memory of Peter.

References

External links
 Elmstead Parish Council

Villages in Essex
Tendring